Samantha Jean Lardner Cornett, (born February 4, 1991) is a retired professional squash player who represents Canada. She is from Deep River, Ontario. She reached a career-high world ranking of World No. 23 in February 2018.
She has won 4 Canadian National Championships, in 2013, 2014, 2015, and 2019.
She won two medals at the 2011 Pan American Games, a gold in the team event alongside Miranda Ranieri, & Stephanie Edmison, and a silver in the singles event. Cornett later won three medals at the 2015 Pan American Games held in Toronto, and three medals at the 2019 Pan American Games held in Lima. 

In January 2018, Cornett was named to Canada's 2018 Commonwealth Games team.

References

External links 

1991 births
Canadian female squash players
Commonwealth Games competitors for Canada
Living people
Pan American Games gold medalists for Canada
Pan American Games silver medalists for Canada
Pan American Games bronze medalists for Canada
Pan American Games medalists in squash
People from Renfrew County
Sportspeople from Ontario
Squash players at the 2010 Commonwealth Games
Squash players at the 2014 Commonwealth Games
Squash players at the 2018 Commonwealth Games
Squash players at the 2015 Pan American Games
Squash players at the 2019 Pan American Games
Competitors at the 2013 World Games
Medalists at the 2015 Pan American Games
Medalists at the 2019 Pan American Games
21st-century Canadian women
20th-century Canadian women